Gabriel Brunet de Sairigné (9 February 1913 – 1 March 1948) was a French Army officer of the French Foreign Legion. He was born in Paris, and was killed in the line of duty close to Lagnia Bien Hoa (Viêt Nam).

Education
He went to the Lycée Pasteur and the Lycée Saint-Louis in Paris before joining the famous École Spéciale Militaire de Saint-Cyr in 1933.

World War II
During World War II, he participated with the Free French Forces in:
1941 : the East African Campaign (in Eritrea and Ethiopia) and the Syria-Lebanon Campaign)
1942 : the Battle of Bir Hakeim, then the Tunisia Campaign
1943 : the Allied invasion of Sicily
1944 : the Operation Dragoon.
1944 : the campaign of Alsace.

He finished the war with the rank of lieutenant colonel, commandant in chief of the First French Free Division (in French: "Première division française libre", or "1ère DFL").

His personal notes dealing with his campaigns during World War II (exactly from 28 February 1940 to 18 June 1945) were published  after his death.

First Indochina War
He was a colonel during the First Indochina War serving with the French Foreign Legion and became the commanding officer of the 13th Foreign Legion Demi-Brigade between 21 August 1946 and his death in the line of duty on 1 March 1948.

Honour
 Commander of the Légion d'honneur
 Compagnon de la Libération (9 September 1942)
 Croix de guerre 1939-1945 (7 citations)
 Croix de guerre des Théatres d'Opérations Extérieures (4 citations)
 Colonial medals with "Tunisia 1942-1943" and "EO" clasps
 Commemorative medal of the 1939-1945 war, with "Norway", "Africa", "France", campaign in Indochina clasps

Books 
 Les Carnets du Lieutenant-colonel Brunet de Sérigné, by André-Paul Comor, collection Nouvelles Éditions Latines, Paris, 1990.
 L'épopée de la 13e demi-brigade de Légion étrangère, 1940-1945, by André-Paul Comor, collection Nouvelles Éditions Latines, Paris, 1988.

External links
  Complete biography on the website of the Order of Libération

1913 births
1948 deaths
Military personnel from Paris
French military personnel of World War II
French military personnel of the First Indochina War
French military leaders
French military personnel killed in the First Indochina War
École Spéciale Militaire de Saint-Cyr alumni
Commandeurs of the Légion d'honneur
Companions of the Liberation
Recipients of the Croix de guerre des théâtres d'opérations extérieures
Officers of the French Foreign Legion
Lycée Saint-Louis alumni
Lycée Pasteur (Neuilly-sur-Seine) alumni
Recipients of the Croix de Guerre 1939–1945 (France)